This is a List of Hindu temples in Germany sorted by state.

Baden-Wüttemberg
 Heilbronn Kanthasamy Kovil, Siemensstraße, Heilbronn
 Sri Sithi Vinayagar Kovil e.V., Stuttgart
 ISKCON Wiesbaden, Wiesbaden (Hessen)
 Sri Meenadchi Ambal Temple, Backnang
 Sri Nagapoosani Amman Aalayam, Pforzheim
 Vedische Kultur Zentrum e.V., Giebel, Stuttgart http://stuttgart-hindutemple.org

Bavaria
 Sivaalayam (based on Siva Panchayatanam), Munich 
 Sri Pillaiyar Temple, Munich
 ISKCON München, Munich
 Hari Om Temple, Munich
 Sri Sithivinayagar Temple, Nürnberg
 ISKCON Jandelsbrunn Simhachalam Temple, Jandelsbrunn

Berlin
 Ramayan Hari Krishna Temple, Berlin
 Sri Ganesha temple, Berlin
 Jagannath-Tempel Berlin (ISKCON), Berliner Allee 209, Berlin-Weißensee
 Mayoorapathy Sri Murugan Tempel, Blaschkoallee 48, 12359 Berlin
 Sri Gauranga und Giriraja Govardhana Tempel/Invalidenstr, Berlin
 Pura Tri Hita Karana, a Balinese temple

Bremen
 Bremen Sri Varasiththivinayakar Tempel e.V, Föhren Str, Bremen
 Sai Baba Temple, Flämische Str. 4, Bremen

Hessen 
 Karpaga Vinayagar Temple, Intze Str-26, Frankfurt
 Sri Nagapooshani Amman Thevasthaanam Hinduistischer Kulturverein Inthumantram Frankfurt am Main 
 Sri Shirdi Sai Baba Temple Frankfurt, Germany, 60599 Frankfurt, Anton-Burger-Weg 44, 069-68600058
 Vishwa Hindu Parisahd e.V., Frankfurt

Nordrhein-Westfalen
 Manawa Bharti Temple, Lenaustraße 01, 40470 Düsseldorf 
 Kathirvelayuthaswamy Temple, Klosterstraße, Essen
 Sri-Kurinjikumaran-Temple, Industriestraße, Gummersbach
 Sri-Kamadchi-Ampal-Temple, Siegenbeckstraße, Hamm
 Sri Venkateswara Perumal Temple e.V., Hamm
 Sri Sithivinayagar Tempel, Ferdinand Poggel Straße, Hamm
 ISKCON Köln e.V., Bhakti-Yoga-Zentrum Gauradesh, Köln
 Sri Saanthanayaki Samethe Chandramouleeswarar Temple, 44225 Dortmund Kiefer Str. 24 
 Tamilengemeinde Krefeld

Saarland
 Sri Mahamariamman Tempel, Sulzbach-Altenwald, Saarland

See also
 Lists of Hindu temples by country
 List of Hindu temples outside India
 List of large Hindu temples
Hinduism in Germany

References

Hinduism in Germany
Hindu temples in Germany
Germany
Hindu temples